Ionuţ Pungă (born 14 October 1979) is a retired Romanian triple jumper. Originally a hurdler, he holds the European age record for the age of 15 with 14.73 over 110 metres hurdles. He later switched to triple jump and won the 1998 World Junior Championships with a jump of 16.94 metres, only 10 centimetres behind the championship record set by Yoelbi Quesada in 1994. The next year Punga finished 5th at the World Indoor Championships. His personal best was 17.04 metres, which he achieved twice in June 1999.

Achievements

External links

1979 births
Living people
Romanian male triple jumpers
Athletes (track and field) at the 2000 Summer Olympics
Olympic athletes of Romania